Ilya Nikkolai (born 25 September 1939 in Kiev, Ukraine) is an Australian visual music artist and architectural designer currently residing in Perth, Western Australia. Nikkolai is known for what he calls "Liquid Music," which has been broadcast in Australia (Channel 31 (Australia), Melbourne and Perth and CTV Perth) and America (Harmony Channel) and on Floating Worlds , a channel featured on Joost.

George Borzyskowski, prominent computer filmmaker and Head of the School of Design at Curtin University, Western Australia, wrote of Ilya’s work: 
“His energy and dedication, together with his unique and consistent investigative methodology, applied to the exploration of acoustic and visual phenomena within the context of contemporary time based audio visual media technologies, has resulted in a remarkable and highly significant body of creative production.
From my own experience I see direct evolutionary relevance in his work to that of previous experimental media artists such as abstract expressionist film maker Oskar Fischinger, Len Lye, some of the work of Norman McLaren, Jordan Belson and others. Ilya Nikkolai’s work in moving forward is informed by an awareness of current research in allied fields together with an appreciation of the demands of today’s critical audiences, as well as his responsibility as an artist to challenge those demands with new experiences and insights.”

Life and work

Early life and career
Ilya Nikkolai was born into an artistic family; his father being the renowned Ukrainian painter Vladimir Kostetsky and his mother, Valentina Kutjunsky, a former film student, painter and engineer. His parents' circle of acquaintances included Nikita Khrushchev, director Sergei Eisenstein, Alexander Dovzhenko and violinist David Oistrakh. He showed an early aptitude for science and music and was accepted into the Vienna Boys' Choir in 1948 after his family, minus his father, fled to Austria during World War II. 

In 1951 Nikkolai migrated to Australia under the International Refugee Scheme of the UN with his grandmother, mother, brother and sister. In 1958 he matriculated in Melbourne University with First Class Honours in Physics and Maths and was awarded a Commonwealth Scholarship. From 1961 to 1964, whilst employed by the Architectural Department of the Victorian Public Works Department, Nikkolai studied part-time at a six-year Architecture Course at RMIT University. During this time he designed and produced working drawings and specifications for numerous suburban and country police stations. He also designed and remodeled the Turana Youth Remand and Classification Centre. Additionally, Nikkolai designed the dwelling (now part of a Heritage Site), for Rikket’s sanctuary in the Dandenong Ranges. 
  
From 1964 to 1966 Ilya was employed as Architectural Design Draftsman by Godfrey Spowers Hughes Mewton and Lobb, a prominent architectural firm. He worked with teams for The Age Newspaper Building, and the Dallas Brookes Hall, which, at the time, served as Melbourne’s premier concert venue. 

Subsequently, Nikkolai worked as a private designer/builder. In 1991 he designed a concept house for Dickson and Curnock, which was awarded an MBA House of The Year. He also designed and constructed  the interior design of a house built for Rick Ardon, a news reader for Channel Seven.

Liquid Music

Liquid Music is a form of visual music which Ilya Nikkolai commenced work on in 1992. It is characterized by flowing, organic shapes and patterns and involves simultaneously occurring layers of music. It is also spatial and is sometimes compared to psychedelic visions or lights and movement associated with near-death experiences. Nikkolai himself had a near-death experience in the mid 1990s, in which he experienced dissolution of his self-identity. Liquid music has been used in therapeutic settings, including at a psychiatric practice, a drug rehab center, and by the Cancer Support Association of Western Australia. 

Liquid Music was regularly broadcast on Melbourne’s Channel 31, beginning in 1994 and going up until 2000. In 1996 Nikkolai became a founding Producer Member of Community Television Perth.  

From 2000 to 2005, Nikkolai experimented with live video direct projection on performers, with the Dian Booth Sound and Colour Music Healing Group, and Robert Boyd, a music therapist. Nikkolai later became an honorary member of "The B Movie Heroes" rock band, who projected Liquid Music at their live concerts. At the time, Liquid Music was also regularly screened at the Metro, The Clink, The G Spot and other nightclubs around Perth, Western Australia. In 2003, a Liquid Music Film was projected at the base of the Pyramids in Giza, Egypt, as part of the Goddess Walk. 

Ilya Nikkolai was Artistic Director of the "Holy Melbourne Annual Multi-faith Concert 2003" at The Arts Centre (Melbourne)'s concert hall, during which Liquid Music was played . In 2004, he was Artistic Director for Bob Randall’s "It’s Time" Concert, at The Arena, Joondalup, which also featured Liquid Music. Liquid Music was a backdrop for the 2005 Launch Concert of the Conscious Living Expo Perth and to the World Peace event in the Supreme Court Gardens in Perth . In 2006, some Liquid Music was licensed to Harmony Channel, a channel broadcast by Comcast in the USA, for six months .

Ilya has said of Liquid Music that he feels "...as if I have landed on a new and unexplored Continent full of exciting possibilities. The Continent is within. The language is not of The Word and Ideas and Beliefs, but that of Light, Colour and the Eternal Movement of Creation."

References

External links
 Liquid Music TV Homepage• Harmony Channel

1939 births
Living people
Visual music artists
Australian digital artists